The Connacht Cricket Union is one of the five provincial governing bodies for cricket in Ireland. Along with the Leinster Cricket Union, Munster Cricket Union, Northern Cricket Union and North West Cricket Union, it makes up Cricket Ireland (formerly known as the Irish Cricket Union). It is the main union under which cricket in the traditional Irish province of Connacht is played. It broke away from Munster Cricket Union and became a separate union in 2010, thus becoming the first Union to be formed in over 60 years.

As of 2012, it has nine teams registered to the union, with seven playing in the League and eight in the Cups. It organises the Connacht Senior League (which is in its fourteenth season) and Connacht Senior Cup. 2012 saw sides from the CCU enter the national cup competitions for the first time and the clubs are all targeting under-age cricket as the next step forward and have plans to kick off an under-age league in the next two years.

References

External links 
 Connacht Cricket Union Official Website
 Cricket Ireland - Provincial Unions

Irish provincial cricket unions
Sports governing bodies in Connacht
2010 establishments in Ireland